"Where Ya At" is a song by American rapper Future featuring Canadian rapper Drake.. Produced by Metro Boomin, it was released on July 17, 2015, as the second single from his third studio album, DS2 (2015).

Chart performance
"Where Ya At" debuted at number 68 on the US Billboard Hot 100 on August 8, 2015. Its chart debut was aided by first-week digital download sales of 37,000. It has reached number 28 on the US Billboard Hot 100, becoming Future's first top 30 single as a lead artist. The song was certified double platinum by the Recording Industry Association of America (RIAA) for sales of over two million digital copies in the United States.

Music video
The music video for "Where Ya At" was directed by Rick Nyce. It was released on Future's Vevo channel on August 20, 2015.

Charts

Year-end charts

Certifications

References

External links

2015 singles
2015 songs
Future (rapper) songs
Drake (musician) songs
Epic Records singles
Songs written by Future (rapper)
Songs written by Drake (musician)
Songs written by Metro Boomin
Song recordings produced by Metro Boomin